"Country Club" is a song written by Catesby Jones and Dennis Lord, and recorded by American country music artist Travis Tritt. It was released in August 1989 as the lead single and title track from Tritt's debut album. It peaked at No. 9 in the United States, and #22 in Canada. The song had originally been cut by Alan Jackson.

Content
The song is a moderate up-tempo in which the male narrator attempts to get the attention of a female who is a member of a country club. After she tells him that only members are allowed in the country club, he responds by saying that he, too, is a member of a "country club" because he likes country music. In the second verse, he continues trying to convince her even further.

Music video
This was Tritt's first music video and it was directed by Jim May.

Personnel
The following musicians play on this track:
Mike Brignardello – bass guitar
Larry Byrom – acoustic guitar
Terry Crisp – steel guitar
Gregg Galbraith – electric guitar
Dennis Locorriere – background vocals
Dana McVicker – background vocals
Mark O'Connor – fiddle
Mike Rojas – piano
Jim "Jimmy Joe" Ruggiere – harmonica
Steve Turner – drums

Chart positions

References

1989 songs
1989 debut singles
Travis Tritt songs
Warner Records singles